Nachuk Tahate Shyama, (translated as "And Let Shyama Dance There" or "Let Shyama Dance There"), is a Bengali language poem written by Vivekananda. The poem was originally published in two issues in Vivekodayam in 1904. The poem was later included in the second volume of The Complete Works of Swami Vivekananda. The long poem relates to one's surrender to the Hindu goddess Shyama or Kali, and is also interpreted as "Let Kali dance there" a poem dedicated to Kali.

Lyrics 
The first stanza of the poem (in English and Bengali) are given below. Read the full poem at Wikisource.

Theme 

Vivekananda dealt with the world of consciousness in this poem. The poem is a fervent appeal of the spiritually oriented luminary to face head on the bad aspects of life, not to be slave to the easy way of life but to address problems of the universe with a positive approach to bring happiness in others' lives. It is in the traditional literature of Bengal, and is a search of the “soul from personal; to divine love and from Kali to Brahma.

According to Indian historian Ramesh Chandra Majumdar the poem included references to natural features, "the charm of sex", and "maddening wine of love". Swami Vivekananda made an English version of his poem, titled "'And Let Shyama Dance There". Ramesh Chandra Majumdar wrote that the English poem "gives a somewhat unique pen-picture of sweet and grim aspects of Nature alternated with telling effect, which shows a literary artist's imageries at their best."

Mohit Chakrabarti, author of Swami Vivekananda, Poetic Visionary, wrote that there is a pictorial element suggested through symbols in the grapes "has also the elements of consciousness with which the poet prepares us for the terrible atmosphere where Shyama would dance in full fury." Chakrabarti also wrote that the imagery of the lips and eyes with the heart "bring forth a perfect image of Shyama who dominates the whole situation with brilliance beyond the range of consciousness".

Influence 
Ratna Ghosh, author of Netaji Subhas Chandra Bose and Indian Freedom Struggle: Subhas Chandra Bose : his ideas and vision, stated that the poem "instilled an attraction for the unknown into the mind of" Subhas Chandra Bose, and that he "very often recited the poem with such an unbounded impetuosity as if it seemed he got an image of his own ideal in it."

Subhas Chandra Bose was deeply impressed by this poem for its attraction to the unknown or metaphysical. He often repeated it in rapturous "unbounded impetuosity" according to his understanding of the poem.

References

Citations

Bibliography
 
 

 
 

Bengali poetry
Indian poems
Works by Swami Vivekananda